Carole Ann Bewley is an American chemist. She is a senior investigator and Chief of the Laboratory of Bioorganic Chemistry at the National Institute of Diabetes and Digestive and Kidney Diseases. Bewley researches secondary metabolites and basic principles involved in protein-carbohydrate interactions and how these can be exploited to engineer therapeutics.

Education 
Bewley completed a Ph.D. from University of California, San Diego in 1995. Her dissertation was titled New antifungal and cytotoxic cyclic peptides and studies of the bacterial symbionts of lithistid sponges.

Career and research 
Bewley is a senior investigator and Chief of the Laboratory of Bioorganic Chemistry at the National Institute of Diabetes and Digestive and Kidney Diseases. Her scientific focus includes chemical biology, molecular pharmacology, structural biology, microbiology, and infectious diseases. Bewley researches secondary metabolites and basic principles involved in protein-carbohydrate interactions and how these can be exploited to engineer therapeutics. She also designs and synthesizes small molecules and peptides that block, or can be used to probe the events that lead to viral entry. Her scientific focus includes chemical biology, molecular pharmacology, structural biology, microbiology, and infectious diseases.

References

External links 
 

Living people
Place of birth missing (living people)
National Institutes of Health people
21st-century American biologists
21st-century American women scientists
American medical researchers
Women medical researchers
1963 births
University of California, San Diego alumni
American women biologists